Langevin is a French surname. The name comes from l'Angevin ("someone from Anjou"). The name is most commonly found in Canada, France, Mauritius and the United States.

Notable people
 Adélard Langevin (1855–1915), Canadian Roman Catholic archbishop
 Charles Langevin (1789–1869), Canadian businessman
 Chris Langevin (b. 1959), Canadian ice hockey player
 Dave Langevin (b. 1954), American ice hockey player
 Dominique Langevin (born 1947), French researcher in physical chemistry. 
 Hector-Louis Langevin (1826–1906), Canadian politician
 Hélène Langevin-Joliot (b. 1927), French nuclear physicist, Frederic Joliot and Irene Curie's daughter
 James Langevin (b. 1964), American politician
 Jean Langevin (1821–1892), Canadian Roman Catholic bishop
 Luce Langevin (1899-2002), French physicist, Paul Langevin's daughter-in-law 
 Michel Langevin (b. 1963), Canadian drummer, founding member of Voivod
 Paul Langevin (1872–1946), French physicist, teacher and philosopher of science
 Paul-Gilbert Langevin (1933-1986), French musicologist, Paul Langevin's son
 Paul Langevin (politician) (1942-2008), Canadian politician
 Robert Langevin, Canadian flautist
 Ronald Langevin (b. 1940), Canadian psychologist

References